The Samsung Galaxy Tab A 10.1 is a 10.1-inch Android-based tablet computer produced and marketed by Samsung Electronics. It belongs to the mid-range "A" series, which also includes 7, and in the past, 8 and 9.7-inch models. It was released in May 2016; the S-Pen (stylus) version was released in September 2016.

Features
The Galaxy Tab A 10.1 comes with Android 6.0 Marshmallow, customized with TouchWiz software and Samsung apps such as S Planner, WatchON, Smart Stay, Multi-Window, Group Play, and the S-Pen suite for the S-Pen version.

As of 2022, the tablet runs a version of Android 8.1.

The Galaxy Tab A 10.1 is available in WiFi-only and 4G/LTE & Wi-Fi variants. It has a 10.1-inch PLS LCD screen with a resolution of 1920x1200 pixels. It also has a 2 MP front camera without flash and a rear-facing 8.0 MP F1.9 AF camera with flash. It has various camera modes like Sports, Beauty, HDR, Auto, Night, Continuous Shot, Pro mode and Panaroma. Overall, the camera gives good performance in daytime and is average in night time photography. Its focusing takes a long time as it is software based. It can focus on surprisingly close things, helping to get good macro shots.

The tablet is extremely thin but is also durable. It has only one physical button at the front, which is the home button, and has three more buttons at the right hand side of the tablet, one power button, one volume up button and one volume down button. There are also two soft buttons present at the front of the screen. One recents and one back button.

Galaxy Tab A 10.1 (2019) 
A new version of the Galaxy Tab A 10.1 was announced in February 2019, with Android 9 Pie (upgradable to Android 11), the Exynos 7904 chipset and an IPS display with unchanged resolution. The rear flash is removed, S-Pen support is dropped and the battery is smaller, while the front camera is upgraded to 5 MP and the speakers are now stereo.

See also
Comparison of tablet computers
Samsung Galaxy Tab series
Samsung Galaxy Tab A 8.0
Samsung Galaxy Tab A 9.7

References

External links

Samsung Galaxy Tab series
Android (operating system) devices
Tablet computers introduced in 2016
Tablet computers